Dezi may refer to:

 Dezi- (or Deci-; symbol d), a decimal unit prefix in the metric system denoting a factor of one tenth

 People
 Aldo Dezi (born 1939), Italian former sprint canoer 
 Jacopo Dezi (born 1992), Italian footballer
 Dezi Arnaz (1917-1986), Cuban-born American actor, musician, and television producer
 Dezi Gallegos, American award-winning playwright and theater director